James MacNeill is the name of:

 James A. MacNeill (1854–1927), former merchant and politician from Prince Edward Island, Canada
 James McNeill (1869–1938), Irish politician and diplomat
 James Walter MacNeill (1873–1945), first superintendent of Saskatchewan Hospital, North Battleford, Saskatchewan
 Jim MacNeill (1928–2016), Canadian consultant, environmentalist, and international public servant

See also
 Jim McNeil (1935–1982), criminal
 Jim McNeill, Polar Explorer